Port Douglas is a coastal town and locality in the Shire of Douglas, Queensland, Australia, approximately 60 km north of Cairns. The town's population can often double, however, with the influx of tourists during the peak tourism season from May to September. The town is named in honour of a former Premier of Queensland, John Douglas. Port Douglas developed quickly based on the mining industry. Other parts of the area were established with timber cutting occurring in the area surrounding the Daintree River and with settlement starting to occur on lots around the Mossman River by 1880.

Previous names for the town included Terrigal, Island Point, Port Owen and Salisbury. The town is situated adjacent to two World Heritage areas, the Great Barrier Reef and the Daintree Rainforest.

Port Douglas was No. 3 on Australian Traveller magazine's list of 100 Best Towns in Australia.

History

The Port Douglas township was established in 1877 after the discovery of gold at Hodgkinson River by James Venture Mulligan. Port Douglas Post Office opened on 1 September 1877. It grew quickly, and at its peak Port Douglas had a population of 12,000 and 27 hotels. With the construction of the Mulligan Highway it serviced towns as far away as Herberton.

Port Douglas State School opened on 11 November 1879, but closed in 1962. It was reopened on 23 January 1989.

When the Kuranda Railway from Cairns to Kuranda was completed in 1891, the importance of Port Douglas dwindled along with its population. A cyclone in 1911 demolished or severely damaged all but seven residential buildings and 4 commercial buildings, including the Wharf buildings (rebuilt), the Courthouse (rebuilt), the Catholic church (rebuilt) and Chinese temple (not rebuilt). At its nadir in 1960 the town, by then little more than a fishing village, had a population of 100.

The Port Douglas War Memorial was unveiled on 10 February 1923 by Mrs Tresize.

On 5 July 1943, a RAAF Vultee Vengeance (Serial Number A27-217) crash landed on the beach near Port Douglas.

In the late-1980s, tourism boomed in the region after investor Christopher Skase financed the construction of the Sheraton Mirage Port Douglas Resort.

The music video for Kylie Minogue's 1988 single "It's No Secret" was filmed in Port Douglas.

In November 1996 United States President Bill Clinton and First Lady Hillary Clinton chose the town as their only holiday stop on their historic visit to Australia. When dining at a local restaurant they witnessed a couple's wedding certificate.

On a return visit on 11 September 2001, Bill Clinton was again dining at a local restaurant, when he was advised of the September 11 attacks. He returned to the United States the following day.

On 4 September 2006, television personality and conservationist Steve Irwin died at Batt Reef, off Port Douglas, after a stingray barb pierced his heart during filming of a documentary called The Ocean's Deadliest. Irwin was filmed snorkelling directly above the stingray when it lashed him with its tail, killing him almost immediately. The event was widely reported in Australia and overseas.

Although historically and currently Port Douglas is with the local government area of Shire of Douglas, between 2008 and 2013, it was within the Cairns Region following a local government amalgamation which was subsequently reversed following a vote by residents of the area.

Port Douglas was a popular location to view the 14 November 2012 solar eclipse that occurred at 6:38 am (local time). Thousands travelled to Port Douglas to see the phenomenon.

Heritage listings

Port Douglas has a number of heritage-listed sites, including:
 Macrossan Street: FDA Carstens Memorial
 Wharf Street: St Mary's by the Sea
 6 Dixie Street: Port Douglas Wharf
 25 Wharf Street: Port Douglas Court House Museum

Population
In the 2016 Census, there were 3,504 people in Port Douglas.  56.6% of people were born in Australia. The next most common countries of birth were England 6.3% and New Zealand 5.9%. 76.6% of people spoke only English at home. The most common responses for religion were No Religion, so described 41.1% and Catholic 17.4%.

Climate
Port Douglas has a tropical monsoon climate according to the Köppen climate classification (Am), with hot summers and warm winters, with heavy rainfall primarily occurring from January–March, the wettest month of the year typically being February.

Education 
Port Douglas State School is a government primary (Prep-6) school for boys and girls at Endeavour Street. In 2017, the school had an enrolment of 281 students with 20 teachers (17 full-time equivalent) and 12 non-teaching staff (8 full-time equivalent).

For secondary school, Port Douglas is within the catchment of Mossman State High School.

Amenities 
The Port Douglas Community Hall houses the Port Douglas Library, 11–29 Mowbray Street, operated by the Douglas Shire Council. The Library opened in 2010. Another branch library is located in Mossman.

The Port Douglas branch of the Queensland Country Women's Association meets at the CWA Hall at 8 Blake Street.

St Mary's Catholic Church is at 2 Endeavour Street. It is within the Mossman-Port Douglas Parish of the Roman Catholic Diocese of Cairns.

Events
The annual Port Douglas Carnivale is held in May and runs for 10 days over two weekends, beginning with a parade attracting over 10,000 people.

In October Porttoberfest (a play on Oktoberfest) is held.

The Great Barrier Reef Marathon Festival is also held during October.

Every May The Port Douglas Yacht Club hold their annual Regatta in May.  Port Douglas Race Week attracts yachts from all along the Eastern Seaboard and provide views for visitors from Four Mile Beach.

Attractions

Kitesurfing is common at the southern end of Four Mile Beach, particularly during the winter months when trade winds blow from the South.

Port Douglas is near the Great Barrier Reef. Numerous companies run daily trips from the marina to the outer reef and the Low Isles for scuba diving and snorkelling. Port Douglas is also well known for its many restaurants, walks, golf courses, and five star resorts.

Near the center of town is a wildlife park that displays crocodiles, tree-kangaroos, cassowaries, koalas, quolls, flying foxes and other native animals.

References

External links

 Port Douglas Tourist Information
 Port Douglas News
 Port Douglas Visitors Guide
Port Douglas Webcam
 Tourism Port Douglas Daintree
 University of Queensland: Queensland Places:Port Douglas

Towns in Queensland
Coastal towns in Queensland
Populated places in Far North Queensland
Shire of Douglas
1877 establishments in Australia
Populated places established in 1877
Port Douglas, Queensland
Fishing communities in Australia
Localities in Queensland